Öndörkhaan (sometimes Undurkhaan), is a town in Mongolia located 290 km east of Ulaanbaatar. On November 18, 2013, the city was renamed to Chinggis City in honor of Genghis Khan, who was born and possibly buried in the same province north of the city. Öndörkhaan serves as the capital of the province Khentii Aimag.

History
On September 13, 1971, Lin Biao died when a Hawker Siddeley Trident he was aboard crashed in Öndörkhaan.

Geography and climate
Öndörkhaan shares its location with the Kherlen sum (municipality) and is the most populous part of the Khentii province.

Öndörkhaan experiences a semi-arid climate (Köppen BSk) with long, dry, frigid winters and short, very warm summers. It borders the Kherlen River and is located on a broad flat unprotected plain.  In winter, when the river freezes over and the winds howl across the open steppe it can easily reach  without the subtraction of wind chill.

Economy 
Coal mining is important to the economy of the town and Chandgana Tal coalfield is located 53 km W from Öndörkhaan.

There exists a major United Nations Development Programme (UNDP) Networking and Cluster Development project stationed in Öndörkhaan specializing in the strengthen of urban, peri-urban and rural business associations and networks so as to reduce the very high unemployment rates.

Transportation 
The Öndörkhaan Airport (UNR/ZMUH) has one unpaved runway and was serviced by regular flights from and to Ulan Bator, before the paved highway was completed.

The town serves as a transportation hub, linking Ulaanbaatar and Choibalsan.

Sister city 
 Hailar District, China.

See also 
 List of cities in Mongolia

References

Aimag centers
Districts of Khentii Province